This is a list of seasons played by Bangor City Football Club in English, European and Welsh football, from 1877 (when the club, then known simply as Bangor F.C., first entered the Welsh Cup) to the most recent season.

Seasons

The Little Giants

Based at the Maes-y-Dref ground Bangor Football Club was formed in December 1876. During this time the only competition for the new club were friendlies until the formation of the new Welsh Cup in 1877. Bangor's first copetetive game would be against Caernarvon Athletic. Bangor left the field while trailing to Newtown WS 3–1. The reason being a Newtown WS player struck a Bangor player and a fight broke out. Both teams complained to the FAW while claiming the match, (Bangor for foul play and Newtown WS for leading the game when the fight broke out). The FAW ordered a replay to which Bangor refused and withdrew from the FAW. After the Northern Welsh Football Association collapsed Bangor returned to the FAW. Bangor Dismissed.

Alliance

Welsh Football

Key 

 P   = Played
 W   = Games won
 D   = Games drawn
 L   = Games lost
 F   = Goals for
 A   = Goals against
 Pts = Points
 Pos = Final position
 italic = Season in Progress

 R1 = Round 1
 R2 = Round 2
 R3 = Round 3
 R4 = Round 4
 R5 = Round 5
 R6 = Round 6

 PR    = Preliminary Round
 QR    = Qualifying Round
 Group = Group stage
 QF    = Quarter-finals
 SF    = Semi-finals
 F     = Final

Leagues 

Welsh Leagues
 NWCL = North Wales Coast League
 NWA  = North Wales Alliance
 WNL  = Welsh National League (North)
 NWFC = North Wales Football Combination
 LOW  = League of Wales
 WPL  = Welsh Premier League
 CA   = Cymru Alliance

English Leagues
 Com.     = The Combination
 B'HAM    = Birmingham & District League
 LANC     = Lancashire Combination
 CCL      = Cheshire County League
 NPL      = Northern Premier League
 NPL-PRM = Northern Premier League Premier Division
 APL      = Alliance Premier League

See also 
Welsh Premier League
Welsh Cup
FA Cup

References

Notes 

 Bangor City.

Bibliography

References 

Seasons
Welsh football club seasons